Green Line 11 (Extension) of the Mumbai Metro is part of the metro system for the city of Mumbai, India. The 14 km (8.7 mi) line from Wadala–CSMT. It is estimated to cost ₹8,739 crores. The Government of Maharashtra is keen to implement expeditiously the Master Plan Corridors recommended by DMRC on a fast track mode and to complete them in the next 3–4 years. To start with, it is decided to take up the task of updating of DPRs and also preparation of new DPRs for the following potential elevated metro corridors

Stations
Total Ten Stations have been planned on this extension. Out of Ten Stations, Eight are Underground and Two are Elevated. The concourse of all elevated stations is proposed along the roads with sufficient Right of way. The stations accommodate the passengers from the eastern port area of Mumbai.

References

Mumbai Metro lines